The 2015 Rabobank Marianne Vos Classic, also known as the Rabobank 7-Dorpenomloop Aalburg, was held on 9 May 2015, in Aalburg, Netherlands. A  women's road cycling race, it was won by Chloe Hosking, who beat Marianne Vos and Amy Pieters.

Results

References

Rabobank Marianne Vos Classic
Rabobank Marianne Vos Classic
7-Dorpenomloop Aalburg